Summer Rain is a musical with book and lyrics by Australian playwright Nick Enright and music by Terence Clarke.

Set in New South Wales, Australia, it's Boxing Day 1945 in Turnaround Creek, an outback town. The dust settles as the town nurses their Christmas hangover. Harold Slocum and his family of the Slocum's Travelling Tent Show are down on their luck and become stranded. They're broke and desperate for an audience; they end up in Turnaround Creek. To the country folk, the prospect of a show is a welcome diversion, but Barry the publican at the Shamrock is strangely unwelcoming. He remembers the last time the Slocums were in the district. Emotions run high and the sedentary life of the town is disturbed by the remembrance of an illicit affair. The musical represses new life breathed into the rural community, and is altogether humorous and sensitive.

Background
Originally written in 1983 for Australia's National Institute of Dramatic Art for the graduating students, the musical has since had professional productions: twice in Sydney (Sydney Theatre Company in 1989 and 2005) and once in Brisbane (Queensland Theatre Company in 1997). Its many amateur and student productions include Western Australian Academy of Performing Arts in 2000, University of Wollongong in 2004, Australian Institute of Music in 2014 and Shellharbour's Roo Theatre in 2014.

Although no cast recording of has been made, the Australian Broadcasting Corporation broadcast a live performance of the 1989 Sydney production on radio. Performers such as Nancye Hayes and David Campbell have recorded the song "Once in a Blue Moon" in solo albums. A 1994 television special on Australian musicals incorporated performances of both "Once in a Blue Moon" and "You Might Miss the Mongrel". The book and lyrics were published by Currency Press.

Reception
Variety said of Sydney Theatre Company's production "the women's roles especially are well-written and the numerous reworkings have ensured the story is tight and focused".

Lauren's Theatre Reviews described Roo Theatre's production of the show as "certain very enjoyable for the most part" and "the script has its ups and down, but ultimately is full of charm and a wide variety of main characters", with praise going to the story's characterisation and mix of both drama and comedy. The music of the show received mixed reception, the review noting feeble songs in the playlist. It listed stand-out examples of the score and said that the rest are unmemorable.

Academia says that the show "honours the musical styles and experiences of a previous Australian generation. This chapter explores the ironic, parodic way that it creates the Australian musical that never existed, a generation after it should have. Australian audiences of the 1940s and 1950s loved the Hollywood musical, and the great American Broadway musicals of the period. It was also a time when the old vaudeville troupes that travelled outback Australia were dying. The songs in Summer Rain deliberately reference both Hollywood and Australian traditions, lightly parodying them in 'Watch the Puddles', or improving them in 'The Casuarina Tree'. At the same time, Enright's musical presents a more modest and laconic Australian attitude, tongue in cheek, and always light-hearted. This story of renewal, forgiveness and recovery after war and drought retrospectively promises a better future for the postwar generation. This chapter analyses some of the patterns of parody and allusion in the play, while arguing that its detailed reference to the language and history of the period prevents it from becoming mere pastiche, and that its humour undercuts its sentimentality."

Synopsis

Act I
The show begins as The Slocum Family and their troupe perform a show on Christmas Eve ("The Show Goes On"). After the show, the troupe all quit when Harold Slocum, the father of the troupe, reveals that he is unable to pay them. Broke and nowhere to go, Harold, his wife Ruby and his two children of a previous marriage, Johnny and Joy travel to an outback town west of Sydney called Turnaround Creek when Harold suddenly gets the idea. On Boxing Day in Turnaround Creek, the few inhabitants of the town arrive at the local pub, the Shamrock and rest their heads from the night before ("Nothin' Doin'"). The Slocums arrive and promise to put on a show, but the owner of the Shamrock, the widowed old man Barry Doyle publicly tells them that they aren't welcome in the town. Just after they arrive, it begins raining, which the town gets ecstatic about, saying that they've been facing a seven-year drought ("Send 'Er Down, Hughie!"). After this, most of the town makes the Slocums feel very welcome, and it does not take long before it becomes clear that there are many difficult relationships in Turnaround Creek ("Something on the Wind"). The Slocums give the town a preview performance of their upcoming show ("Tango D'Amour") and afterwards, Harold reminisces on a woman he met in the town once, Barry's dead wife Nancy Doyle, after discovering that she passed not long after he last visited the town 16 years ago ("The Eyes of Nancy Doyle"). After the Slocums have a fun night of drinking with the town's inhabitants ("Hear The One About...?"), Barry confronts Harold about his affair with his wife all those years ago. After Ruby breaks them apart before a physical confrontation, Barry reminisces when he met his wife ("The Eyes of Nancy Keenan"). The next day, Joy Slocum strikes up a romantic relationship with the town bookie Clarrie Nugent ("Watch The Puddles") and Johnny Slocum continues to make strong advances toward Barry's eldest daughter, Peg Hartigan, who is already married to Mick Hartigan ("Summer Rain").

Act II
The Slocums perform their show with songs by Harold and Ruby ("Once in a Blue Moon"), Joy and Clarrie ("Dark Handsome Chappie") and the Slocum family ("At The End of the Parade"). After very positive reception from most of the town's residents, Harold agrees on behalf of the whole family to stay in the town to celebrate New Years. Ruby laments how she misses the man Harold used to be ("Abracadabra Man"), as Peg is torn between her husband and Johnny ("Dark Handsome Stranger"). Barry sees the yellow dress Peg plans on wearing to New Years and is suddenly reminded of his dead wife ("Casuarina Tree"). The town dances the new year in ("The New Year") and afterward, Ruby and Nancy Doyle's sister Renie McKenna complain about the men in their lives, Harold and Barry respectively ("You Might Miss The Mongrel"). Harold and Barry soon reconcile ("Morning in Her Eyes") after Barry confesses that his youngest daughter Cathy is actually the biological daughter of Harold and Joy decides whether to stay in Turnaround Creek with Clarrie or leave with her family, while Cathy also chooses between staying in the town or leaving with the Slocums and Peg struggles to stay with Mick or leave with Johnny ("The Word on the Wind"). The next day, the Slocums except Joy say their goodbyes to Turnaround Creek. Peg stays with Mick and after the Slocums leave, Barry reveals that Cathy is gone as the town watch the Slocums' truck drive away.

Musical numbers

Not including the brief reprises

Characters

Other characters include the troupe members from the beginning of the show, such as Bryce Barclay, Texas, Diamantina Price, Cora Price, Magda and Cecil. Other extra townsfolk also inhabit Turnaround Creek.

References

See also

Lists of musicals



1983 musicals
Australian musicals